The M.W. Beijerinck Virology Prize (M.W. Beijerinck Virologie Prijs) is a prize in virology awarded every two years by the Koninklijke Nederlandse Akademie van Wetenschappen (KNAW). The prize consists of a medal and a monetary award of €35,000. KNAW's two conditions for the prize nomination are that the nominee must be an internationally recognized researcher who has "made a groundbreaking contribution to research in the field of virology in the broadest sense" and must have an appointment at a university or research institute.

The prize is named in honor of the Dutch microbiologist Martinus Willem Beijerinck. KNAW appoints an advisory committee which gives advice to KNAW concerning the prize nominees. KNAW has regulations for who may submit nominations. Before 2014 the prize was awarded every three years.

Prize winners
1966  Egbertus van Slogteren, Netherlands
1969  , United States	
1972  W. Berends, Netherlands
1975  E.M.J. Jaspars and A. van Kammen, Netherlands
1978  Lex van der Eb, Netherlands
1983  B.A.M. van der Zeijst, Netherlands
1986  Walter Fiers, Belgium
1989  , Netherlands
1992  H. zur Hausen, Germany
1996  , Netherlands/Germany
1998  A.D.M.E. Osterhaus, Netherlands	
2001  R.A. Weiss, United Kingdom
2004  D.C. Baulcombe, United Kingdom
2007  Charles M. Rice, United States
2010  Eckard Wimmer, United States
2013  Félix Augusto Rey, France
2015  Peter Palese, United States
2017  Raul Andino, United States
2019  Eva Harris, United States
2021  Ralf Bartenschlager, Germany

References

Awards established in 1966
Dutch honorary society awards
Awards of the Royal Netherlands Academy of Arts and Sciences
1966 establishments in the Netherlands